UB-165 is a drug which acts as an agonist at neuronal nicotinic acetylcholine receptors being a full agonist of the α3β2 isoform and a partial agonist of the α4β2* isoform. It is used to study the role of this receptor subtype in the release of dopamine and noradrenaline in the brain, and has also been used as a lead compound to derive a number of other selective nicotinic receptor ligands.

References 

Nicotinic agonists
Stimulants
Pyridines
Chloroarenes
Nitrogen heterocycles